Kottekad railway station (Code: KTKU) is a railway station in Palakkad District, Kerala and falls under the Palakkad railway division of the Southern Railway zone, Indian Railways.

References

Railway stations in Palakkad district
Palakkad railway division